Herman Paul Schnetzky (1849 – 1916) was a German American architect who is known for his works in Milwaukee, Wisconsin. Schnetzky was active designing buildings in the late 19th century.

Career
In 1867 Schnetzky emigrated to the United States. In 1869 he worked in the draft department of Milwaukee architect George Mygatt. He formed a partnership with Henry Koch which lasted until 1887. When Schnetzky left Koch's office to start his own architectural firm, Eugene R. Liebert followed to work as Schnetzky's foreman. In 1891, Liebert became a partner with Schnetzky. 

Schnetzky partnered with Eugene R. Liebert in 1892, and together they designed many buildings in Milwaukee, Wisconsin. Their partnership lasted until 1897. The duo's best known buildings were in the German/Roman Renaissance Revival style. Liebert left to form his own architectural office in 1897.

Personal
He was married to Maria Louise Knab Schnetzky and together they had two children, Oscar Paul Schnetzky and Hugo Walter Schnetzky. Hugo Walter Schnetzky studied architecture at Columbia University and returned to work with his father until Herman Schnetzky's death.

List of works

All buildings are in Milwaukee unless otherwise noted
Greenfield School in West Allis (1887)
St. Lucas Lutheran, 1888
Fifth Street School 1888 (with John Moller)
McGeoch Building  (Schnetzky & Liebert), 1890
Blatz Brewing Company Office 1890
J. P. Kissinger Block (Schnetzky & Liebert), 1893
Lohman Livery Stable (Schnetzky & Liebert), 1893
Ernst Pommer House (Schnetzky & Liebert), 1895
Germania Building (Schnetzky & Liebert), 1896 
F Mayer Boot and Shoe Company factory 1892-1899
St. Michael’s Church (with Schnetzky)
St. Stephen Lutheran School (with Schnetzky)
West Division High School (with Schnetzky)

References

1849 births
1916 deaths
People from Brandenburg
Architects from Milwaukee
German emigrants to the United States